Edge Hill may refer to:

Places

United Kingdom

Merseyside and Lancashire
 Edge Hill, Liverpool, a district of Liverpool, England
 Edge Hill railway station, Liverpool
 Edge Hill railway works
 Edge Hill University, named after its original location, Edge Hill, Liverpool, but now located in Ormskirk, Lancashire
 Liverpool Edge Hill (UK Parliament constituency), the relevant Parliament constituency

Warwickshire
 Edge Hill, Warwickshire, an escarpment and hamlet in Stratford-on-Avon district
 Battle of Edge Hill, a 1642 battle in the English Civil War that took place near Edge Hill
 Edge Hill, North Warwickshire

United States
 Edge Hill, Georgia
 Edge Hill Farm, Georgetown, Kentucky, listed on the National Register of Historic Places listings in Scott County, Kentucky
 Edge Hill, Pennsylvania
 North Hills station, formerly known as Edge Hill

Virginia
 Edge Hill (Gladstone, Virginia), listed on the National Register of Historic Places in Amherst County
 Edge Hill (Richmond, Virginia), listed on the National Register of Historic Places in Henrico County
 Edge Hill (Shadwell, Virginia), listed on the National Register of Historic Places in Albemarle County
 Edge Hill (Woodford, Virginia), the childhood home of United States President Thomas Jefferson, listed on the National Register of Historic Places in Caroline County

Australia
 Edge Hill, Queensland, a suburb of Cairns, Queensland
 Edge Hill State School, in Edge Hill, Queensland

Other uses
 Battle of White Marsh, a 1777 battle in the American Revolutionary War, also known as the Battle of Edge Hill

See also
 Edgehill (disambiguation)